Cummings Mesa is a summit (elevation ) on the Navajo Nation in northern Coconino County, Arizona and southern San Juan, Utah in the western United States, about  west-southwest of Navajo Mountain.

Cummings Mesa was named for Byron H. Cummings, a scientist who worked in the area.

See also

 List of plateaus and mesas of Utah

References

Landforms of Coconino County, Arizona
Landforms of San Juan County, Utah
Mesas of Utah
Mesas of Arizona
Geography of the Navajo Nation